Colonel Gary D. Brown is an American lawyer and former officer in the United States Air Force.

Academic career

Guantanamo military commission

In 2017 Brown was appointed the legal advisor to a Guantanamo military commission's newly appointed Convening authority, Harvey Rishikof.

Rishikof and Brown's appointments were terminated in early 2018.  Observers commented that their termination suggested a disagreement between the pair and their superiors at the Pentagon.

In July 2020 Brown told National Public Radio that he and Rishikof had been negotiating plea agreements with the lawyers of the men facing charges.  They'd take the death penalty off the table, if the suspects agreed to plead guilty and accept a sentence of life imprisonment.

Whistleblower

In 2019 Brown formally filed a whistleblower report alleging substantial government waste, at Guantanamo.  According to Brown, operating costs at Guantanamo had been $6 billion.

References

Guantanamo Bay attorneys
Year of birth missing (living people)
Living people
University of Central Missouri alumni
University of Nebraska–Lincoln alumni
Alumni of the University of Cambridge
American whistleblowers